Lesticus janthinus is a species of ground beetle in the subfamily Pterostichinae. It was described by Pierre François Marie Auguste Dejean in 1828.

References

Lesticus
Beetles described in 1828